Barikeh (also Romanized as Bārīkeh; also known as Bārīkeh-ye Kālīāb) is a village in Veysian Rural District, Veysian District, Dowreh County, Lorestan Province, Iran. At the 2006 census, its population was 28, in 7 families.

References 

Towns and villages in Dowreh County